Life Journey is an album by singer, multi-instrumentalist and songwriter Leon Russell produced by Tommy LiPuma (with Elton John credited as executive producer) released on April 1, 2014. It was recorded in 2013 and 2014. In this album, Russell renewed his songwriting after his 2010 collaboration album with John, The Union. Leon has two original songs on the album, "Big Lips" and "Down in Dixieland". 

Leon Russell took this ‘Life Journey’ on tour in 2014 and 2015.
Touring with him was multi-instrumentalist Beau Charron, longtime bassist Jackie Wessel and drummer Brandon Holder.

Life Journey is Leon's next to last album, as his death was in November 2016. On a Distant Shore recorded in 2016 and released on September 22, 2017, was Leon's last album. Clayton-Hamilton Jazz Orchestra played on "Georgia On My Mind", "I Got It Bad & That Ain’t Good", and "New York State Of Mind."

Reception
The album received general positive reviews. Rock critic Nick DeRiso wrote: "Nothing quite matches Russell interpreting Russell, as heard on Big Lips — which also features Chris Simmons on slide, Abe Laboriel Jr. on drums and Willie Weeks on bass."
AllMusic reviewer, Stephen Thomas Erlewine, wrote about the album: "This small list suggests how Life Journey touches upon much of the music Russell has sung over the years -- it's heavy on R&B, blues, jazz, and swing, but strangely lacking in much country." AllMusic rated the Life Journey album as one of the Best of 2014.

Track listing
All songs performed by Leon Russell	 
Title   - Composer  - run time
1  Come On in My Kitchen   -   Robert Johnson  	2:20 	
2  Big Lips - Leon Russell	3:12 	
3 Georgia on My Mind   -  Hoagy Carmichael and Stuart Gorrell	4:52 	
4  That Lucky Old Sun   -  Haven Gillespie and  Beasley Smith 4:09 	
5 Fever   - Eddie Cooley and John Davenport	4:19 	
6  Think of Me   - Mike Reid	3:28 	
7 I Got It Bad (and That Ain't Good)  - Duke Ellington and Paul Francis Webster	4:29 	
8 The Masquerade Is Over  -   Herb Magidson and Allie Wrubel 5:44 		
9 I Really Miss You  - Paul Anka	4:12 	
10  New York State of Mind - Billy Joel  5:27 	
11  Fool's Paradise -Johnny Fuller, Bob Geddins and Dr. David Rosenbaum	2:54 	
12  Down in Dixieland - Leon Russell - 3:07

Personnel
Leon Russell - Composer, Liner Notes, Piano, Primary Artist, Vocals, Vocals (Background)
Elton John - Executive Producer
Tommy LiPuma - Producer
Shari Sutcliffe - Music Contractor, Production Coordination
Clayton-Hamilton Jazz Orchestra - Featured Artist
George Bohanon - Trombone
Lee Callet - Sax (Tenor)
William Cantos - Vocals (Background)
Gilbert Castellanos - Trumpet
Alvin Chea - Vocals (Background)
Jeff Clayton - Clarinet, Sax (Alto)
John Clayton - Arranger, Bass, Conductor
Sal Cracchiolo - Trumpet
Graham Dechter - Guitar (Acoustic)
Dixieland Band - Featured Artist
Keith Fiddmont - Sax (Alto)
James Ford - Trumpet
Robben Ford - Guitar
Larry Goldings - Hammond B3
James Gordon - Clarinet
Jeff Hamilton - Drums
Clay Jenkins - Trumpet
Abe Laboriel Jr. - Drums
Greg Leisz - Pedal Steel, Pedal Steel Guitar
Darrell Leonard - Flugelhorn, Trumpet
Christoph Luty - Bass
Hugh McCracken - Guitar, Soloist
Perry Morgan - Vocals (Background)
Ira Nepus - Trombone
Charles Owens - Sax (Tenor)
Ryan Porter - Trombone
Louis Price - Vocals (Background)
Chris Simmons - Slide Guitar
Maurice Spears - Trombone (Bass)
Bijon Watson - Trumpet
Willie Weeks - Bass
Anthony Wilson - Guitar
Rickey Woodard - Sax (Tenor)
Elena Barere - Concert Master
Alan Broadbent - String Arrangements
Jill Dell'Abate - String Contractor
Chandler Harrod - Engineer, Pro-Tools
Mark Lambert - Piano Engineer, Vocal Engineer
Ryan Roth - Design, Photography
Doug Saks - Mastering
Elliot Scheiner - String Engineer
Al Schmitt - Engineer, Mixing
Mike Diehl - Design

References

External links
 Leon Russell - "Big Lips" lyric video on YouTube
Leon Russell discography
Leon Russell lyrics
Leon Russell NAMM Oral History Program Interview (2012)

2014 albums
Leon Russell albums
Albums recorded at Capitol Studios